Dunfermline East may mean or refer to:

 Dunfermline East (UK Parliament constituency)
 Dunfermline East (Scottish Parliament constituency)